Jouko Soini (born 2 March 1956) is a Finnish former footballer. He competed in the men's tournament at the 1980 Summer Olympics. He also played 1 friendly international for Finland in 1980. At club level he represented Helsingin Jalkapalloklubi for 10 seasons in Mestaruussarja before ending his career at FinnPa in Ykkönen.

References

External links
 

1956 births
Living people
Finnish footballers
Finland international footballers
Olympic footballers of Finland
Footballers at the 1980 Summer Olympics
Footballers from Helsinki
Association football defenders
Association football midfielders